Marlene Creates  (born 1952) is a Canadian artist lives and works in Portugal Cove, Newfoundland. Born in Montreal, Quebec, Creates studied visual arts at Queen's University, then lived in Ottawa for twelve years, moving to Newfoundland in 1985.

A major theme of her work is the relationship between human beings and the land; she often photographs subtle traces and marks of human presence in natural environments. Her work has been shown in over 300 exhibitions across the world.

In 2001 Creates, was elected to the Royal Canadian Academy of Arts, and in 2013 she won CONTACT Photography Festival's BMW Prize for her exhibition Marlene Creates: selected works from 30 years, 1982-2012. The exhibition "gently invites us to think about how we belong to the land, and how we leave our touch upon it." Creates was a 2019 recipient of the Canadian Governor General's Award in Visual and Media Arts.

Education
Creates attained her bachelor's in art education at Queens University in Kingston, Ontario, attending from 19701974. She traveled to Venice, Italy in 1973 as part of the university's Art and Architecture Study. In 1975 she was selected as a Canadian delegate to France for an Architecture Study Program.

Artistic career

Initial Career 1980-1985
As part of the Art Gallery of Ontario Extension Services "Artist with their Work" Program, Creates exhibited a collection of thirteen cibachrome photographs of landscapes on the east and west coasts of Canada, England, Wales, and Ireland. In describing the exhibit she says: 
"The actions of nature may seem random or unpredictable; the way smooth stones sit naturally at the shore appears to have no organization. I have found though, that if I manipulate any of them, the interference is obvious. The kind of order I impose is unlikely to occur naturally. But the imposition is slight. The next high tide will disturb my arrangement and re-organize the elements again. Nature is never finished."
As a part of the exhibit, Creates also hosted an illustrated lecture and landscape art workshop with local participants in the Thunder Bay region. Creates also toured with the exhibit to Windsor.

Recent career 
Creates has centered her recent work around six acres of woods (owned by the artist) in Portugal Cove, NL. There she has established the Boreal Forest Poetry Garden, which sees annual thematic programming of live art, poetry readings and collaborations between artists, while making thematic links between art and science.[1][2]

A major retrospective of Marlene Creates’ work called Marlene Creates: Places Paths and Pauses toured across Canada from 2017 to 2019. Curated by Susan Gibson Garvey (independent curator; former Director/Curator, Dalhousie Art Gallery) and Andrea Kunard (Associate Curator of Photography, National Gallery of Canada), and organized by The Beaverbrook Art Gallery and the Dalhousie University Art Gallery, the exhibition was hosted by The Dalhousie Art Gallery (Halifax, NS), the Beaverbrook Art Gallery[3] (Fredericton, NB), The Rooms Art Gallery (St. John’s, NL), Confederation Centre Art Gallery (Charlottetown, PEI), and Carleton University Art Gallery[4] (Ottawa, ON). An accompanying catalogue presents the work from the exhibition, with text by the curators (published by Goose Lane Editions, Fredericton, 2017).

Awards
Queen's University Bursary for study in Venice, Italy 1973−
 Ontario Arts Council Grants
 Canada Council Grants 
Governor General's Award in Visual and Media Arts 2019
 Order of Newfoundland and Labrador (2021)

Bibliography

References

External links
Artist's Website
Women Artists in Canada
Center for Contemporary Art artist profile

1952 births
Artists from Montreal
Artists from Newfoundland and Labrador
Canadian multimedia artists
Canadian photographers
Canadian women photographers
Living people
Members of the Royal Canadian Academy of Arts
People from Portugal Cove-St. Philip's
Queen's University at Kingston alumni
20th-century Canadian women artists
20th-century Canadian artists
20th-century women photographers
Governor General's Award in Visual and Media Arts winners
Members of the Order of Newfoundland and Labrador